3 Day Weekend is a 2019 feature-length puzzle thriller notable for being made with no dialogue. It was written and directed by Wyatt McDill, and produced by Megan Huber who together own the film's production company, Sleeper Cell Films. 3 Day Weekend stars Maya Stojan, Morgan Krantz, Nathan Phillips, and Scott MacDonald through the events of a kidnapping over the course of a three day weekend.

First appearing at a special screening of the film at the Twin Cities Film Festival, 3 Day Weekend had its world premiere at the 2020 Cinequest Film Festival in San Jose, California. In 2020, Showtime bought the broadcast rights for larger distribution, opening availability to North American audiences. 3 Day Weekend was formally released in North America on October 23, 2020.

Plot 
3 Day Weekend follows the point of view of four different characters through the same events of one three day weekend. Each point of view creates a different perspective of what is happening, initially as an amateur camper stumbling across a kidnapping in progress, then a jailhouse rendezvous, a double-cross, and eventually a revenge plot, depending on which character is misinterpreting the story.

Cast 
 Maya Stojan as Shan
 Morgan Krantz as Ben Boyd
 Nathan Phillips as Schnappsie
 Scott MacDonald as Sledge

Production 
3 Day Weekend was shot in the countryside near Park Rapids, Minnesota over the course of 17 days.

Reception 
3 Day Weekend world premiered at the 2020 Cinequest Film Festival in San Jose, California after winning an Indie Vision Screenplay Award at a special screening of the film at the Twin Cities Film Festival. Showtime bought the North American broadcast rights in 2020. The film has been called "suspenseful and entertaining" by Randy Myers of The Mercury News.

References 

2019 films
American thriller films
Films without speech
2019 thriller films
Films shot in Minnesota
2010s American films